Beneck is a surname. Notable people with the surname include:

Anna Beneck (1942–2013), Italian swimmer
Daniela Beneck (born 1946), Italian swimmer